Elijah Albert Cox (1876–1955), also known as E. A. Cox and E. Albert Cox, was a British painter.

He was born in Islington, London and educated at the Bolt Court Technical School. Between 1915 and 1926, Cox designed posters for London Underground, including a series of posters on the theme of “London Characters”. He also worked as an illustrator in several books, notably Edward Fitzgerald’s edition of The Rubaiyat of Omar Khayyam in 1944. Many of Cox's artwork was displayed at the Royal Academy of Arts, London and the Victoria and Albert Museum.

A series of portraits of Cox by photographer Howard Coster are displayed at the National Portrait Gallery.

Awards and honours 

 Fellow of the Royal Society of British Artists, 1915 
 Fellow of the Royal Institute of Painters, 1921

References 

1876 births
1955 deaths
British painters
20th-century British artists